The Miltalie orogeny also termed the Miltalie event was a small orogenic event 400 millions after the Sleaford orogeny in the Proterozoic, indicated by metasedimentary rocks preserved in the Miltalie Gneiss.

See also
List of orogenies

References

Orogenies of Australia
Proterozoic orogenies